The Tigers were a popular Japanese band during the Group Sounds era in the late 1960s. The group featured Kenji Sawada as their lead singer, and were signed by Watanabe Productions.

The group was first named "Funnys", and was formed in 1966. They changed their name to "The Tigers" on their first TV performance on 15 November 1966. They appeared in several Japanese movies in the late 1960s.

The Tigers recorded "Smile for Me", composed by Barry and Maurice Gibb of The Bee Gees, which was released as a single in July 1969 in the UK and Japan. Also in March 1969, the group was featured on the cover of the US magazine Rolling Stone, the cover story was about rock music in Japan.

On 24 January 1971, The Tigers held their last concert, The Tigers Beautiful Concert, at the Nippon Budokan. After The Tigers broke up, Sawada formed the first Japanese supergroup, Pyg, in 1971.

In 1981, they reunited.

Singles
My Mary (Debut Single)
Seaside Bound
Mona Liza's Smile
Love Only For You
Flower Necklace／Romance in Milky Way（Double A Side）
C-C-C
A White Dove
Blue Bird
A Decree Of Love
Grief
Smile For Me
Now I Forgive You／Love Love Love
Solitude The City
The Free Travel
Promise For Future

Movies
Dorifutazu desu yo! Zenshin zenshin matazenshin (1967, Toho)     Director: Yoshinori Wada

The Tigers: The World Is Waiting For Us (1968, Toho)    Director: Yoshinori Wada

The Tigers: Gorgeous Invitation (1968, Toho)   Director: Kunihiko Yamamoto

The Tigers: Hi! London (1969, Toho)   Director: Katsuki Iwauchi

Kigeki migimuke hidari! (1970, Toho)
Director: Yôichi Maeda

References

External links
 The Tigers
 Modcineaste: The Tigers record reviews in English
 The Tigers Beautiful Concert 1971
 Hi London 1969 Film

Japanese rock music groups
Musical groups established in 1966
Musical groups disestablished in 1971
Musical groups reestablished in 1981
1966 establishments in Japan
Japanese garage rock groups